Kivarz-e Olya (also Romanized as Kīvarz-e ‘Olyā and Kīvarz ‘Olyā; also known as Kīvarz-e Bālā) is a village in Borborud-e Gharbi Rural District, in the Central District of Aligudarz County, Lorestan Province, Iran. At the 2006 census, its population was 134, in 23 families.

References 

Towns and villages in Aligudarz County